Pietro Reverberi (December 28, 1912 in Reggio Emilia, Italy – February 19, 1985 in Reggio Emilia, Italy) was an Italian basketball referee. He called over 3,000 games in Italy, on different levels of competition. He refereed in the 1952 Summer Olympics, 1956 Summer Olympics, and 1960 Summer Olympics, and in several FIBA World Cups, and EuroBaskets. In 2007, he was enshrined into the FIBA Hall of Fame.

The Premio Reverberi basketball award is named in his honor.

External links
 FIBA Hall of Fame page on Reverberi

1912 births
1985 deaths
FIBA Hall of Fame inductees
Basketball in Italy
Basketball referees
People from Reggio Emilia